The Office Assistant is a discontinued intelligent user interface for Microsoft Office that assisted users by way of an interactive animated character which interfaced with the Office help content. It was included in Microsoft Office for Windows (versions 97 to 2003), in Microsoft Publisher and Microsoft Project (versions 98 to 2003), Microsoft FrontPage (versions 2002 and 2003), and Microsoft Office for Mac (versions 98 to 2004).

The default assistant in the English version was named Clippit (commonly nicknamed Clippy), after a paperclip. The character was designed by Kevan J. Atteberry. Clippit was the default and by far the most notable Assistant (partly because in many cases the setup CD was required to install the other assistants), which also led to it being called simply the Microsoft Paperclip. The original Clippit from Office 97 was given a new look in Office 2000.

The feature drew a strongly negative response from many users. Microsoft turned off the feature by default in Office XP, acknowledging its unpopularity in an ad campaign spoofing Clippit. The feature was removed altogether in Office 2007 and Office 2008 for Mac, as it continued to draw criticism even from Microsoft employees.

In July 2021, Microsoft used Twitter to show off a redesign of Clippit (which they called "Clippy" in the Tweet), and said that if it received 20,000 likes they would replace the paperclip emoji on Microsoft 365 with the character. The Tweet quickly surpassed 20,000 likes and they then announced to replace it. In November 2021, Microsoft officially updated their design of the paperclip emoji (📎) on Windows 11 to be Clippit/"Clippy".

Overview
According to Alan Cooper, the "Father of Visual Basic", the concept of Clippit was based on a "tragic misunderstanding" of research conducted at Stanford University, showing that the same part of the brain in use while using a mouse or keyboard was also responsible for emotional reactions while interacting with other human beings and thus is the reason people yell at their computer monitors. Microsoft concluded that if humans reacted to computers the same way they react to other humans, it would be beneficial to include a human-like face in their software. As people already related to computers directly as they do with humans, the added human-like face emerged as an annoying interloper distracting the user from the primary conversation.

First introduced in Microsoft Office 97, the Office Assistant was codenamed TFC during development. It appeared when the program determined the user could be assisted by using Office wizards, searching help, or advising users on using Office features more effectively. It also presented tips and keyboard shortcuts. For example, typing an address followed by "Dear" would cause the Assistant to appear with the message, "It looks like you're writing a letter. Would you like help?"

Assistants
Apart from Clippy, other Office Assistants were also available:
The Dot (a shape-shifting smiley-faced red ball)
Hoverbot (a robot)
The Genius (a caricature of Albert Einstein, removed in Office XP but available as a downloadable add-on)
Office Logo (a jigsaw puzzle composed of four pieces, which was the logo for Microsoft Office 9x)
Mother Nature (a globe)
Scribble (an origami-esque cat)
Power Pup (a superhero dog)
Will (a caricature of William Shakespeare).

In many cases the Office installation CD was necessary to activate a different Office assistant character, so the default character, Clippy, remains widely known compared to other Office Assistants.

In Office 2000, the Hoverbot, Scribble, and Power Pup assistants were replaced by:
F1 (a robot)
Links (a cat)
Rocky (a dog)

The Clippy and Office Logo assistants were also redesigned. The removed assistants later resurfaced as downloadable add-ons.

The Microsoft Office XP Multilingual Pack had two more assistants, an animated secretary, and a version of the Monkey King for Asian language users in non-Asian Office versions. Native language versions provided additional representations, such as Kairu the dolphin in Japanese.

A small image of Clippy can be found in Office 2013 and newer, which can be seen by going to Options and changing the theme (or Office Background) to "School Supplies". Clippy would then appear on the ribbon.

Technology
The Office Assistant used technology initially from Microsoft Bob and later Microsoft Agent, offering advice based on Bayesian algorithms. From Office 2000 onward, Microsoft Agent (.acs) replaced the Microsoft Bob-descended Actor (.act) format as the technology supporting the feature. Users can add other assistants to the folder where Office is installed for them to show up in the Office application, or install in the Microsoft Agent folder in System32 folder. Microsoft Agent-based characters have richer forms and colors, and are not enclosed within a boxed window. Furthermore, the Office Assistant could use the Lernout & Hauspie TruVoice Text-to-Speech Engine to provide output speech capabilities to Microsoft Agent, but it required SAPI 4.0. The Microsoft Speech Recognition Engine allowed the Office Assistant to accept speech input.

Compatibility
The Microsoft Agent components that it requires are not included in Windows 7 or later; however, they can be downloaded from the Microsoft website. Installation of Microsoft Agent on Windows 8, Windows 8.1, Windows 10 and Windows 11 is also possible. When desktop compositing with Aero glass is enabled on Windows Vista or 7, or when running on Windows 8 or newer, the normally transparent space around the Office Assistant becomes the assistant's transparency color, which is usually solid-colored pink, blue, or green.

Additional downloadable assistants

Since their introduction, more assistants have been released and have been exclusively available via download.

 Bosgrove (a butler)
 Courtney (a flying car driver)
 Earl (a surfboarding alien)
 Genie (a genie)
 Kairu the Dolphin, otherwise known as Chacha (available for East Asian editions, downloadable for Office 97)
 Links (a cat)
 Max (a Macintosh Plus computer) (Macintosh)
 Merlin (a wizard)
 Peedy (a green parrot, which was ultimately reused in the first iteration of the notorious BonziBuddy software)
 Robby (a robot)
 Rover (a golden retriever, also featured as Windows XP Explorer's search companion.)
 The Monkey King (available for East Asian editions, downloadable for Office 97)

The 12 assistants for Office 97 could be downloaded from the Microsoft website.

Criticism and parodies

The program was widely reviled among users as intrusive and annoying, and was criticized even within Microsoft. Microsoft's internal codename TFC had a derogatory origin: Steven Sinofsky states that "C" stood for "clown", while allowing his readers to guess what "TF" might stand for. Smithsonian Magazine called Clippit "one of the worst software design blunders in the annals of computing". Time magazine included Clippit in a 2010 article listing the fifty worst inventions.

Although helpful to brand-new users, and although introduced at a time when relatively few people had extensive experience with computers, Clippy was criticized for interrupting users and not providing advice that was fully adapted to the situation.

In July 2000, the online comic strip User Friendly ran a series of panels featuring Clippit. In 2001, a Microsoft advertising campaign for Office XP included the (now defunct) website officeclippy.com, which highlighted the disabling of Clippit in the software. It featured the animated adventures of Clippit (voiced by comedian Gilbert Gottfried) as he learned to cope with unemployment ("X… XP… As in, ex-paperclip?!") and parodied behaviors of the Office assistant. Curiously, one of these ("Clippy Faces Facts") uses the same punchline as one of the User Friendly comic strips. These videos can be downloaded from Microsoft's website as self-contained Flash Player executables. In the latest video of the series, Clippit ends up in an office as a floppy disk ejecting pin.

In August 2001, a Microsoft Windows Flash-based parody named Windows RG was made by internet comedian JamesWeb. Windows RG is a parody of Windows Me that parodied the operating system’s crashes and instabilities in a more humorous and satirical way. It featured parodies of Microsoft Word and Clippit. Upon starting the pseudo-application, the Clippit-style character informs the user that they are not writing a letter but that the assistant likes letters and they should too. The assistant then instructs the user to start with the words "Milk" and "Sponge", and then adds a picture of an enlarged paperclip, which the assistant claims that it’s their brother. The pseudo-app then crashes afterwards, with a dialog box saying that "paperclip.exe" had performed "94,708" illegal operations and will be shot. After this, the assistant will then appear to be lying dead on the floor with blood spewing out (which the assistant questions itself by saying "why they have blood" even though they are a paperclip). Another dialog box appears afterwards, saying that Word has performed an illegal operation ("killed a paperclip") and will be "arrested" (which for that reason actually meant closed). Another Flash-based Windows parody, Windows FU (meant to be a parody of Windows XP), also featured parodies of Microsoft Word and Clippit in a similar manner to Windows RG.

There is a Clippit parody in the Plus! Dancer application included in Microsoft Plus! Digital Media Edition which is later included as Windows Dancer in Windows XP Media Center Edition 2005. The dancing character Boo Who? is wearing a ghost outfit, roughly having the shape of Clippit's body, with a piece of wire visible underneath. Occasionally, the white sheet slips, and reveals the thin curve of steel. The description mentions "working for a short while for a Redmond, WA based software company, where he continued to work until being retired in 2001". Clippit is also included as a player character in Microsoft Bicycle Card Games and Microsoft Bicycle Board Games. It was also used in the "Word Crimes" music video by "Weird Al" Yankovic.

Vigor is a Clippit-inspired parody software—a version of the vi text editor featuring a rough-sketched Clippit.

In a June 2008 episode of the NPR show Wait Wait... Don't Tell Me! marking the occasion of Bill Gates transitioning to semi-retirement from Microsoft, humorist Adam Felber and comedian Paul Provenza ad-lib a scenario in which Clippit (referred to as Clippy) is being driven to a location outside of Redmond, Washington, at night and says such things as "It looks like you're digging a grave. Is this a business grave or a personal grave?" The segment has become one of the most requested by listeners for replay during "best of" reviews of the show.    

On April 1, 2014, Clippit appeared as an Office Assistant in Office Online as part of an April Fools' Day joke. Several days later, an easter egg was found in the then-preview version of Windows Phone 8.1. When asked if she likes Clippit, the personal assistant Cortana would answer "Definitely. He taught me how important it is to listen." or "What's not to like? That guy took a heck of a beating and he's still smiling." Her avatar occasionally turned into a two-dimensional Metro-style Clippit for several seconds. This easter egg is still available in the full release version of the Windows Phone operating system and Windows 10.

A Clippit easter egg is also found in Apple's personal assistant, Siri, although it is less flattering, saying things like "Clippy?! Don't get me started." or "The less said about Clippy the better."

In Google Assistant, when asked if she trusts, knows, likes, or is Clippy, she responds with "Clippy? Clippy is legendary", with a smiling emoji at the end. And when asked why, she simply has no idea why Clippy is legendary. And when asked if she knows who Clippy is, she states she remembers the user has told her, with the answer "Clippy is an office."

The built-in linting tool of the Rust programming language, which was created in 2014, is named Clippy as a reference to Clippit.

On April 1, 2015, Tumblr created a parody of Clippit, Coppy, as an April Fools joke. Coppy is an anthropomorphized photocopier that behaved in similar ways to Clippit, asking the user if they want help. Coppy would engage the reader in a series of pointless questions, with a dialogue box written in Comic Sans MS, which was deliberately designed to be extremely annoying. In 2022, Tumblr created a YouTooz collectible of Coppy.

In popular culture

Clippit is often the subject of humorous parody and reference, including internet memes. It has been lampooned in multiple television series, such as The Office,  and Silicon Valley.

Clippit is portrayed as a romantic interest in "Conquered by Clippy", a tongue-in-cheek erotic story by Leonard Delaney.

In 2015, a music video directed by Chris Bristow was released for Delta Heavy's song Ghost, which features Clippit discovering Shania, a modern voice-activated digital assistant, and later on Clippit becomes angry upon discovering the modern landscape of the world.

See also
 Microsoft Bob
 Ms. Dewey
 Tafiti
 Tay (bot)
 Talking Moose
 Virtual assistant

References

External links 
 Clippy discontinued in Office 12
 Download additional Agents Office 97 (Quiet Office Logo, Kairu, Earl, F1)
 Download Office 97 Assistant: Kairu the Dolphin
 Clippy returns in Microsoft's April Fools' pranks
 Luke Swartz — Why People Hate the Paperclip – Academic paper on why people hate the Office Assistant
 Microsoft Agent Ring - download more unofficial characters
 "Farewell Clippy: What's Happening to the Infamous Office Assistant in Office XP" (April 2001) at Microsoft.com

Human–computer interaction
Fictional shapeshifters
Microsoft Office
Technical communication